John William Griggs (July 10, 1849 – November 28, 1927) was an American lawyer and Republican Party politician, who served as the 29th governor of New Jersey, from 1896 to 1898. As Governor of New Jersey Griggs gained a reputation for siding with "the little guy" in conflicts between impoverished workers and their employers; he was also an advocate of civil rights for African-Americans. Griggs only left the Governor's mansion when he stepped down to accept the position of the United States Attorney General from 1898 to 1901.

Early life
He was born on his family's farm in Newton, New Jersey on July 10, 1849. He graduated from Lafayette College in 1868, where he became a founding member of the Phi Charge of Theta Delta Chi.

Career
Griggs served in the New Jersey General Assembly in 1876 and 1877, and the New Jersey Senate from 1883 through 1888, acting as the president of the Senate in 1886. He was selected as a delegate to the 1888 Republican National Convention from New Jersey.

Holding his inauguration at Taylor's Opera House in 1896 at a formal affair, he was elected Governor of New Jersey and served from 1896 through 1898. He left the state house in 1898 to serve as United States Attorney General under President William McKinley until 1901.

He was also a trustee to his alma mater, Lafayette College from 1894 to 1900.

He was one of the first members appointed to the Permanent Court of Arbitration at the Hague, and served from 1901 to 1912.

When the Consolidated National Bank of New York was organized on July 1, 1902, the fourteen directors included individuals such as Griggs, Henry C. Brewster, George Crocker, Mortimer H. Wagar, and Perry Belmont. In 1905 he was named the president of the Marconi Wireless Telegraph Company of America, and held that office until the company was reorganized as the Radio Corporation of America (RCA) in 1919. At RCA he was a director and the company's general counsel until his death.

Death
Griggs died on November 28, 1927 in Paterson, New Jersey. He was buried at Cedar Lawn Cemetery in that city.

Honors
Griggs Avenue in Teaneck, New Jersey bears his name.

References

External links

John W. Griggs, The Political Graveyard

|-

|-

|-

1849 births
1927 deaths
Republican Party governors of New Jersey
Lafayette College alumni
Lafayette College trustees
Republican Party members of the New Jersey General Assembly
Republican Party New Jersey state senators
United States Attorneys General
People from Newton, New Jersey
American Protestants
Presidents of the New Jersey Senate
Members of the Permanent Court of Arbitration
McKinley administration cabinet members
19th-century American politicians
Burials at Cedar Lawn Cemetery
Consolidated National Bank people
American judges of international courts and tribunals